Benjamin Price "Ben" Weston was a sailor from the United States, who represented his country at the 1928 Summer Olympics in Amsterdam, Netherlands.

Sources
 

American male sailors (sport)
Sailors at the 1928 Summer Olympics – 8 Metre
Olympic sailors of the United States
1892 births
1947 deaths